-Fa-Tal- Gal a Todo Vapor is the first live album by Brazilian singer Gal Costa, released in 1971. It was ranked the 20th best Brazilian album of all time by the Brazilian Rolling Stone magazine.

Track listing

References 

1971 live albums
Gal Costa albums
Philips Records live albums